Fred W. Johnson was an American government official who served as the first director of the Bureau of Land Management from 1946 to 1948. Johnson had previously served as the final commissioner of the General Land Office, from 1933 until 1946.

After the General Land Office was dissolved in 1946, he was selected to serve as the newly created Bureau of Land Management's director by then-Interior Secretary Julius Albert Krug.

References 

General Land Office Commissioners
Bureau of Land Management personnel
Franklin D. Roosevelt administration personnel
Truman administration personnel
Year of birth missing
Year of death missing